was a town located in Sōsa District Chiba Prefecture, Japan.

Noda and Sakae villages were established on April 1, 1889, within Sōsa District, Chiba. The two villages merged on July 17, 1954, to form Nosaka Town.

On January 23, 2006, Nozaka was merged with the neighboring city of Yōkaichiba to create the city of Sōsa.

Dissolved municipalities of Chiba Prefecture
Sōsa